Daniel Nii Ayi Laryea (born 11 September 1987) is a Ghanaian football referee who is a listed international referee for FIFA since 2014. He is also one of the referees for the Ghana Premier League.

In 2021, Laryea was officially selected as a referee for the delayed 2020 African Nations Championship in Cameroon.

He officiated the 2021 Ghanaian FA Cup final between Hearts of Oak and the Ashanti Gold. Laryea was also one of the appointed referees of the 2021 Africa Cup of Nations in Cameroon.

Early life
Laryea was born on 11 September 1987 in Accra. He had his secondary education at the Accra Academy where he played football and later became the goalkeeper for the school's football team. He holds a bachelor of Science degree in Accounting from the University of Ghana Business School, and a degree in Physical Education from the University of Education, Winneba.

Career
Laryea began as a professional referee in the Ghanaian lower division league at the age of 17 in 2005. In 2012, aged 24, he officiated his first Ghana Premier League between Medeama and Berekum Chelsea, and two years later, he became a FIFA listed referee.

Following his enlistment, Laryea has officiated in a number of international football competitions including; the 2017 CAF U-17 Cup of Nations which was held in Gabon, the 2018 WAFU Cup of Nations in Ghana, the 2018 CHAN hosted by Morocco, and the 2020 CHAN tournament held in Cameroon. He was summoned to officiate the 2021 Ghanaian FA Cup final between Hearts of Oak and the Ashanti Gold. He also officiated the high-profile debut match between Hearts of Oak and Asante Kotoko in the 2020–21 season. Laryea was also one of the appointed referees of the 2021 Africa Cup of Nations in Cameroon.

Laryea officiated during the 2022 CAF Women’s Champions League in Morroco. He was the Assistant video assistant referee (AVAR) for the 2022 CAF Women's Champions League Final. On 6 December 2022, he also made the list of officials for the rescheduled 2022 African Nations Championship in Algeria. On 13 January 2023, he served as the Assistant video assistant referee for the opening match for the competition between Algeria and Libya.

Personal life
Laryea enjoys physical training and basketball in his leisure time. He also loves to model and take pictures.

References

External links 

 
 Daniel Nii Laryea at World Referee

1987 births
Living people
Ghanaian football referees
People from Accra
Sportspeople from Accra
Alumni of the Accra Academy
University of Ghana alumni
University of Education, Winneba alumni
Ga-Adangbe people